Arthur Hull was an English football goalkeeper. He made over 100 Football League appearances for Blackpool in four years in the early 20th century. In season 1902–03, he made one appearance as a midfielder.

References

English footballers
Association football goalkeepers
Blackpool F.C. players
Year of death missing
Year of birth missing